George Louis Costanza is a fictional character in the American television sitcom Seinfeld (1989–1998), played by Jason Alexander. He is a short, stocky, balding man who struggles with numerous insecurities, often dooming his romantic relationships through his own fear of being dumped. He is also remarkably lazy; during periods of unemployment he actively avoids getting a job, and while employed he often finds ingenious ways to conceal idleness from his bosses. He is friends with Jerry Seinfeld, Cosmo Kramer, and Elaine Benes. George and Jerry were junior high school friends (although in "The Betrayal", Season 9, Episode 8, George says the two have been friends since fourth grade) and remained friends afterward. George appears in every episode except "The Pen" (third season).

The character was based on Seinfeld co-creator Larry David but is surnamed after Jerry Seinfeld's real-life New York friend, Michael Costanza. Alexander reprised his role in an episode of Comedians in Cars Getting Coffee, reuniting with Jerry Seinfeld and Wayne Knight (also reprising their roles as Jerry and Newman, respectively).

Early life and family
George is the son of Frank, an Italian-American, and Estelle Costanza. George twice mentions that he has a brother. Lloyd Braun is a childhood nemesis who George feels was the son his parents always wanted. George's best friend Jerry Seinfeld described Frank and Estelle as "psychopaths", and said in "The Chinese Woman" that, if they had divorced when George was young, he "could have been normal".

In "The Junior Mint", George states he grew up in Brooklyn, New York, where he went to a public school. In a previous episode he mentions he went to high school on Long Island. He met Jerry during his youth, and they remained friends from that point on. George and Jerry both attended John F. Kennedy High School, class of 1971. During their high school years, George and Jerry frequently hung out at a pizzeria called Mario's Pizzas, where the former, having the highest score "GLC", would play Frogger (although Frogger debuted in 1981, well after the pair's high school graduation in 1971). George was picked on by his gym teacher Mr. Heyman, who deliberately mispronounced his name as "Can't stand ya" and gave him wedgies.

Two of George's cousins appear on the show: Shelly, who briefly appears in "The Contest", and Rhisa, whom George plans to date in order to shock his parents in "The Junk Mail". George talks to his parents about his family in "The Money", during which it is revealed that he had an "Uncle Moe", who "died a young man" and an "Aunt Baby", who died at the age seven of internal problems. It is also revealed that his mother has a "Cousin Henny". In "The Doll", it is revealed that Frank Costanza was born in Italy and has a cousin, Carlo, who still lives there. As of "The Robbery", George had living grandparents whom he had recently visited, although it is never made clear whether these were his mom's or dad's parents.

Personality
George is neurotic, self-loathing and dominated by his parents, yet also prone to occasional periods of overconfidence that invariably arise at the worst possible time. Throughout Seinfelds first season, despite doing poorly on his SATs and despite being afraid of embarrassing himself on an IQ test on "The Cafe", George is depicted as moderately intelligent – at one point, he mentions an intellectual interest in the Civil War and, in some early episodes, appears almost like a mentor to Jerry – but becomes less sophisticated, to the point of being too lazy even to read a ninety-page book (Breakfast at Tiffany's), preferring to watch the movie adaptation at a stranger's house instead. In "The Abstinence", it is discovered that George has what would appear to be genius-level intelligence but can never access it because his mind is always so completely focused on sex. One Chicago Tribune reviewer noted that, despite all his shortcomings, George is "pretty content with himself".

George exhibits several negative character traits, among them dishonesty, insecurity, and anxiety, many of which seem to stem from a dysfunctional childhood with his eccentric parents Frank and Estelle, and often form the basis of his involvement in various plots, schemes, and embarrassing social encounters. Episode plots frequently feature George manufacturing elaborate deceptions at work or in his relationships to gain or maintain some slight or imagined advantage or (pretend) image of success. He is shown to be having an intense fear of commitment. He had success in "The Opposite", where he starts (with Jerry's encouragement) to do the complete opposite of what his instincts tell him to do, which results in him getting a girlfriend and a job with the New York Yankees. His anxiety is also evident in "The Note", where he begins doubting his sexuality after receiving a massage from a male masseur.

George refers to himself in the third person when under extreme stress (for example, "George is getting upset!"), after befriending a person with a similar trait in "The Jimmy".

George flees a burning kitchen during his girlfriend's son's birthday party, knocking over several children and an old woman so he can escape first in "The Fire". There are moments where George exhibits remarkable courage, but usually accidentally and often in support of inane lies he would rather not confess to. For instance, in "The Marine Biologist", he goes into the sea alone to save a beached whale because his date, a woman on whom he had a crush in college, thinks he is a marine biologist and even tells her the truth about his occupation after he saves the day.

George often takes impressive measures to build and maintain relationships with women. In "The Conversion," he goes through the process of converting to the Latvian Orthodox religion as his girlfriend's parents would not let her date somebody outside their religion. The one relationship he holds long-term, with his fiancée Susan, is the one about which he is seemingly least enthusiastic, as shown by his ongoing attempts to first postpone, and later cancel, their wedding and his rather nonchalant reaction when she dies.

He is interested in nice restrooms, and his personal bathroom habits border on obsession. In "The Revenge", he quits his real estate job solely because he is forbidden to use his boss' private bathroom. In "The Voice", he admits that one of the reasons he is staying at a job his boss has asked that he resign from (for feigning a disability) is that it gives him "private access to one of the great handicapped toilets in the city". In "The Busboy", he claims to have an encyclopedic knowledge of the locations of the best public bathrooms in the city. He proves this in "The Bizarro Jerry", when he directs Kramer to "the best bathroom in midtown" at the offices of Brandt-Leland, even describing the layout, marble, high ceiling, and toilets that flush "like a jet engine". In "The Gymnast", he told Jerry that he always removes his shirt when using the bathroom because "it frees me up... no encumbrances". When working for the Yankees, he suggested having the bathroom stall doors stretched all the way to the ground (letting people's legs not be seen while in the stalls). The obsession even comes up in the Seinfeld reunion staged on Curb Your Enthusiasm: years after the series, George is said to have made a fortune on a smartphone app that directs its user to the nearest "acceptable" public toilet anywhere in the world (though he loses most, if not all, of his fortune to Bernie Madoff).

George and Jerry have been best friends since meeting in high school gym class. The extreme closeness of their friendship is occasionally mistaken for gayness. "The Outing" deals with a reporter from a New York University college paper mistaking George and Jerry for a gay couple, and, in "The Cartoon", George dates somebody who Kramer insists is merely a "female Jerry".

Development
Seinfeld co-creator Larry David based George largely on himself. Seinfeld and David created the character as a counterpoint to Seinfeld's character. In the first draft of the show's pilot script, called Stand-Up at the time, George's name was "Bennett" and he, like Jerry, was a comedian. In that same draft, the scene in the pilot in which George and Jerry discuss a woman Jerry met earlier, instead saw George and Jerry discussing their stand-up act. His name was changed to George, and he became a real estate broker instead. George's last name comes from Michael Costanza, a college classmate of Seinfeld. "Louis", George's middle name is a homage to Lou Costello, whose 1950s television series The Abbott and Costello Show, inspired Seinfelds writing style. Although he is often asked whether he wanted to play the character, Larry David has said that he was only interested in writing the show, and he highly doubted that NBC would have approved of his being cast.

Casting director Marc Herschfield stated that, during casting for the character, "we saw every actor we could possibly see in Los Angeles", but they could not find the right actor for the part. Among the auditionees were Nathan Lane, David Alan Grier, Brad Hall and Larry Miller. A 2011 article by Bradford Evans in Splitsider claims those considered for Costanza include Danny DeVito and Nathan Lane, while Jason Alexander himself has noted that Steve Buscemi, Paul Shaffer and Chris Rock were also considered for the role. Robert Schimmel also auditioned.

On April 3, 1989, Herschfield sent a partial script to Jason Alexander, who was in New York City at the time. Herschfield had met Alexander when he was working on the CBS sitcom E/R. Alexander enjoyed the script and felt it read like a Woody Allen film; therefore, he did a Woody Allen impression on his audition tape and bought a pair of glasses to better resemble the actor. Though Alexander thought his audition was "a complete waste of time", both David and Seinfeld were impressed; Seinfeld stated "the second we saw him, like two lines out of his mouth, we went 'That's the guy. On April 10, 1989, at 9:00 a.m. Alexander did his first official audition and met David and Seinfeld. While in the waiting room for his final audition, Alexander saw that Larry Miller was also auditioning. Alexander was aware that Miller and Seinfeld were very good friends, and so figured that he would not get the part. After his final audition, he returned to New York City, and when he landed he received a phone call informing him that he was hired.

Many of George's predicaments were based on David's past real-life experiences. In "The Revenge", for example, when George quits his job in a fury only to realize he has made a mistake, he goes back the next day as if nothing happened; this mirrors David's actions while working as a writer for Saturday Night Live, when he quit and then returned to his job in the same manner. As the show progressed, Alexander discovered that the character was based on David. As Alexander explains in an interview for the Seinfeld DVD, during an early conversation with David, Alexander questioned a script, saying, "This could never happen to anyone, and even if it did, no human being would react like this." David replied, "What do you mean? This happened to me once, and this is exactly how I reacted." After that, Alexander changed his performance from an imitation of Woody Allen to what he has called a "shameless imitation of Larry David."

In 1998, Michael Costanza sued the show for US$100,000,000, claiming that he never gave permission for his name to be used and that, because of the character's appearance and behavior, he was not treated with respect. Costanza lost the suit, as the New York Supreme Court decided that Seinfeld and David "did not violate Michael Costanza's privacy rights when they created the character".

Other information

Susan
George becomes engaged to Susan Ross, an executive at NBC who approved his and Jerry's show-within-a-show sitcom pilot. George and Susan date, during which time commitment-phobic George is constantly trying to find ways to end their relationship without actually having to initiate the breakup with her. In "The Engagement", he proposes to her after he and Jerry make a pact to move forward with their lives, despite his not having dated her for years. When Jerry breaks up with his girlfriend almost immediately thereafter for eating "her peas one at a time" and declares the deal over, George tries repeatedly to weasel out of his engagement. In "The Invitations", she dies from licking the toxic glue in their wedding invitations. When notified of her death at the hospital, George displays a combination of shock, apathy, and relief. A few moments after being notified of Susan's death, he says to Jerry, Kramer, and Elaine, "Well, let's go get some coffee." Susan's parents appoint him to the board of directors of the Susan Ross Foundation.

George is very bad at meeting women and even worse at maintaining his romantic relationships and, as a result, his relationships usually end badly.

Professional life
George's professional life is unstable. He is unable to remain in any job for any great length of time before making an embarrassing blunder and getting fired, and he is unemployed for a large amount of time throughout the series. Very often, the blunder is lying and trying to cover it up, only to have it all fall apart. Most of the many short-lived jobs George holds throughout the series are in sales.

Over the course of the series, he works for a real estate transaction services firm (Rick Bahr Properties), a rest stop supply company (Sanalac), a publishing company Elaine also works at (Pendant Publishing), the New York Yankees (his longest running job), a playground-equipment company (Play Now) and an industrial smoothing company (Kruger Industrial Smoothing). He is fired from his job at Pendant Publishing for having sex with the cleaning woman on his desk in "The Red Dot" (he professes he has always been attracted to cleaning women).

George works briefly for his father selling computers.

His original job when the series starts is as a real estate agent; he ends up quitting and getting re-hired, but fired immediately afterward for drugging his boss. He always wanted to be an architect or least "pretend to be an architect". He first mentions this desire in "The Stake Out", and claims in "The Race" that he had designed "the new addition to the Guggenheim".

During Season 4, George gains experience as a sitcom writer as he helps Jerry to write the pilot for the fictitious show Jerry. While pitching the concept of a "show about nothing" to NBC executives, George begins dating NBC executive Susan Ross until "The Virgin", when she is fired. The Jerry pilot is never picked up.

Fashion and hairstyle
George has balding hair, which is less noticeable in "The Seinfeld Chronicles" or a flashback in "The Slicer", but gets thinner as the series progresses. At the end of  "The Scofflaw", he starts to wear a toupee, until Elaine throws it out the window in disgust in "The Beard". He also tries to restore his hair in "The Tape", when he starts using a Chinese cream that is said to be such a great cure for baldness that it will make him "look like Stalin". His hair is rarely seen styled. His clothing is usually very plain. He frequently wears jeans and Nike Cortez sneakers. George has, however, mentioned that his clothes are color-coded based on his mood. Several times throughout the show, George mentions a desire to "drape" himself in velvet (if only it were socially acceptable), which he does in "The Doodle". In "The Bizarro Jerry", George can be seen styling his hair based on an Andy Sipowicz poster.

Art Vandelay

Art Vandelay is an alias used by George in "The Stake Out". To explain their presence in the lobby of an office building, Jerry and George come up with a cover story based around a man they plan to meet named Art Vandelay, an importer-exporter who works in the building. George frequently reuses the invented name as a running joke.  George tells Elaine's boss at the publishing company that he frequently reads Art Vandelay's work.  In "The Boyfriend", George tells the unemployment office he is close to getting a job at "Vandelay Industries". He later tells Susan that Art is Elaine's boyfriend as part of a cover story to prevent Susan from learning that he is dating Marisa Tomei ("The Cadillac").  In "The Bizarro Jerry", George asks the receptionist at Brandt/Leland for Mr. Art Vandelay. In "The Serenity Now", George invents fake customers, one of whom is "Mr. Vandelay", to hide his lack of sales success. In "The Puerto Rican Day", George pretends to be Vandelay (Jerry pretends to be "Kel Varnsen", and Kramer is "H.E. Pennypacker") to take advantage of an open house to watch a Mets game on television. In "The Finale", the name of the presiding judge is Arthur Vandelay, much to George's amazement.

Reception
In a list of the "50 Greatest Sidekicks" compiled by Entertainment Weekly, George was placed third behind Robin from the Batman franchise and Ed McMahon, who co-hosted The Tonight Show Starring Johnny Carson from 1962 to 1992. On a The Times-Union list of the 50 greatest sitcom characters of all time, George was ranked third, behind Lucy Ricardo from I Love Lucy and Barney Fife from The Andy Griffith Show. In 1999, TV Guide published a list of the 50 best characters in television history, on which George was ranked 10th. The People called George the greatest television character on a list of the 100 best television characters. British comedian Ricky Gervais and Guardian columnist Marina Hyde have both called George "arguably the greatest sitcom character of all time".

For his performance as George, Alexander was nominated for various awards. In 1992, he received his first Primetime Emmy Award nomination in the category Outstanding Supporting Actor in a Comedy Series; however, he lost the award to Michael Jeter for Evening Shade. He received nominations in the same category the following six years, but failed to win each year. In addition, Alexander was nominated for four Golden Globe Awards—in 1993, 1994, 1995, and 1998—in the Best Supporting Actor in a Series, Miniseries, or Motion Picture Made for Television category, but never won the award. In 1995, Alexander received the Screen Actors Guild Award for Outstanding Performance by a Male Actor in a Comedy Series, he also shared the Screen Actors Guild Award for Outstanding Performance by an Ensemble in a Comedy Series with Seinfeld, Louis-Dreyfus, and Richards. From 1996 through 1998, Alexander was nominated in the same two categories, co-winning the ensemble award in 1997 and 1998. In 1999, he was nominated for Outstanding Performance by a Male Actor in a Comedy Series for the last time, but lost to Michael J. Fox for his portrayal of Michael Flaherty on Spin City. In 1992 and 1993, Alexander won the American Comedy Award for Funniest Supporting Male Performer in a TV Series. He was also nominated for the award in 1996 (with Richards) and 1999, but did not win again.

References
 Explanatory notes

From "The Puffy Shirt" to "The Opposite", George lives with his parents at 1344 Queens Boulevard (his parents' address is revealed in "The Cigar Store Indian").

 Citations

External links

 

Seinfeld characters
Television characters introduced in 1989
Fictional characters based on real people
Fictional Italian American people
American male characters in television